Richard Richardsson (born 12 April 1979) is a retired Swedish football goalkeeper. In the 2007 Allsvenskan he scored a goal for Örebro SK.

References

1979 births
Living people
Swedish footballers
Association football goalkeepers
Trelleborgs FF players
IFK Göteborg players
Örebro SK players
IK Sirius players
GIF Sundsvall players
Allsvenskan players
Superettan players